Marriage on the Rocks/Rock Bottom is the fourth album by American rock band The Amboy Dukes, released in 1970. It is the first of two albums released on the Polydor label. The album peaked at #191. There were no accompanying singles released by the record company. There was no "designated" lead vocalist for this album as with all the previous Dukes albums. Keyboardist Solomon contributed most of the vocals. The original album contained a lyric sheet, but the re-release on Polydor PD-1-6073 did not.

Track listing 
All tracks composed by Ted Nugent, except where indicated.

Personnel 
Ted Nugent – guitar, vocals
Andy Solomon – keyboards, vocals, saxophone
Greg Arama – bass
Dave Palmer – drums

References 

1970 albums
The Amboy Dukes albums
Polydor Records albums